"À l'ombre" (English: In the Shadow) is a song recorded by the French singer Mylène Farmer. This electropop song was written by Farmer with music composed by Laurent Boutonnat. It was the lead single from her ninth studio album Monkey Me (2012), released on 22 October 2012 digitally, and on 26 November in physical formats. The single entered the French chart at number four, then dropped out of the top 50 and jumped to number one on the chart edition of 8 December 2012. It also peaked in the Belgian (Walloon) chart at number two.

History
On 16 October 2012, the RTL journalist Anthony Martin revealed on Twitter the title of Farmer's new single, and it was said that the music and lyrics were respectively of Boutonnat and Farmer. Two days later, the cover of the CD single was shown on Twitter by Polydor France. On 22 October, the song was sent to radio stations and simultaneously was made available on the download platforms from 8:00 am. Remixes by Guéna LG and then by The Young Professionals were posted on social networks in early November.

Music and lyrics
"À l'ombre" is an electropop, dance song similar in style to the songs on Farmer's Point de suture album. The lyrics describe somebody, potentially Farmer, wallowing in self-doubt and questioning their self-worth. They also may allude to a disillusionment with the struggle to stay famous and viable. The sombre mood of the song fits in with Farmer's attraction to misery and despair as seen on previous tracks Je t'aime mélancolie and Fuck Them All.

Music video

On 29 November 2012, TF1 announced on its site that an excerpt of the music video for "À l'ombre" would be shown three days later on the evening new programme, and that Farmer would be interviewed by the news presenter Claire Chazal the next day. On 1 December 2012, indeed, a one-minute preview of the music video was shown at the end of the broadcast. The video was directed by Laurent Boutonnat and inspired by the French artist Olivier de Sagazan, and especially his work Transfiguration. De Sagazan said that Farmer contacted him and that he agreed to perform in the video, and explained that the "unfolding of [his] the work makes the chronology of the video", adding that his work deals with a "large organic chaos". The music video was shot in Paris in November 2012, in an 800-square meter studio.

According to the newspaper Le Point, "Sagazan's work is a mixture of beautiful, and sometimes disturbing, painting and sculpture which plays with appearances and fears. The work of the performer looks so much like the singer's world that one wonders why both did not meet earlier." Just after the news broadcast, the full music video was available on the TF1 website. It shows Farmer singing, dancers performing a choreography in the mud, de Sagazan covering his face with mud and wolves running in the fog.

Thomas Montet of Pure People deemed the video "disturbing", seeing in it "the praise of madness". According to de Sagazan, the music video is "magnificent".

Reception
According to Julien Chadeyron of Le Nouvel Observateur, "À l'ombre" is "so effective and haunting".

In France, two hours after its availability on digital platforms, the song became number one on iTunes. On the chart edition of 27 October 2012, the song entered the French chart at number four, with 8,875 downloads, then dropped to number 69 with 960 downloads. It continued to drop the following two weeks, falling out of the top 100, then climbed to number 59, and reached number one the next week, when the physical formats were released, selling 22,027 units that week. "À l'ombre" thus became Farmer's twelfth number one solo and thirteenth overall single in France. Then it dropped to number 21.

In the French-speaking part of Belgium (Wallonia), the song entered the Ultratop 50 at number six on 3 November 2012, then dropped to number 34 and fell until the last rank of the chart the next two weeks before rocketing to number 19 in the fifth week, then to number three and eventually to number two.

Formats and track listings
 CD single

 CD maxi 1

 CD maxi 2

 12" maxi

 CD single – Promo

 CD maxi – Promo – Remixes

 Digital download

Credits and personnel
These are the credits and the personnel as they appear on the back of the single:
 Mylène Farmer – lyrics
 Laurent Boutonnat – music
 Requiem Publishing – editions
 Nathalie Delépine – photograph
 Henry Neu – design
 Made in the E.U.

Charts

Peak positions

Year-end charts

Release history

See also
 List of number-one hits of 2012 (France)
 List of artists who reached number one on the French Singles Chart

References

Mylène Farmer songs
2012 singles
Songs with music by Laurent Boutonnat
Songs with lyrics by Mylène Farmer
Music videos directed by Laurent Boutonnat
SNEP Top Singles number-one singles
2012 songs